Kyaka Bridge, sometimes referred to as the Kagera Bridge, is a bridge in Tanzania that crosses the Kagera River. The bridge was blown up by Ugandan experts from Kilembe Mines in 1978 during the Uganda–Tanzania War. The present bridge was supplied by the British  structural steelwork fabricators Painter Brothers.

References

Bridges over the Kagera River
Bridges in Tanzania